The Aston Martin RB6 is a 2.5-litre, naturally-aspirated, inline-6 racing engine, developed and designed by Aston Martin for Formula One racing; used between  and . The RB6 also shared the basic double-overhead camshaft straight-6 Aston Martin engine design with its brethren, but sleeved to reduce its capacity to 2.5-litres. Although Tadek Marek's design was a reliable and powerful unit in its 3.7-litre road car form, the reduced capacity racing motor was hard-pressed to cope with the heavy chassis and poor aerodynamics, and frequent engine failures blighted the DBR4's brief racing career. Aston Martin claimed a  output for the DBR4's engine. This value is still higher than that provided by the Coventry Climax FPF straight-4, used by contemporary manufacturers such as Lotus and Cooper, but the Aston Martin engine weighed appreciably more. The engine drove the rear wheels through a proprietary David Brown gearbox, provided by Aston Martin's owners.

The DBR5's engine was smaller and lighter. The new engine modifications meant that the power output was finally close to the figure originally claimed by the Aston Martin workshop.

Applications
Aston Martin DBR4
Aston Martin DBR5

References

Straight-six engines
Aston Martin
Formula One engines
Aston Martin in Formula One